Psarolitia is a genus of moths of the family Xyloryctidae.

Species
 Psarolitia albogriseella Viette, 1956
 Psarolitia ambreella Viette, 1968

References

Xyloryctidae
Xyloryctidae genera